The Institute of Socio-Political Research under the Russian Academy of Sciences  (ISPR RAS) is a leading Russian academic research center. It is engaged in a fundamental and applied research of social and socio-political processes.

It was established in 1991 in Moscow.

The basic areas and directions of the scientific researches involve: global problems of contemporary civilization and Russia; analysis and forecasting of Russia’s socio-political development; social dynamics, structure and stratification of Russian society; methods and instruments for sociological research; sociology of management; political and economic sociology; demographic and migratory processes; sociology of federate and interethnic relations; social problems of national security; sociology of human rights; sociology of youth; social ecology, etc.

The Institute makes a socio-political analysis of the decisions made by the governmental, legislative and executive bodies.

Since 1992 on it has been engaged in a “How do you do, Russia?” sociological monitoring conducted under the strategic socio-political research.

The ISPR boasts a solid sociological and demographic data bank.

It publishes some scientific journals including Eurasia, Nauka. Kultura. Obshchestvo /Science. Culture. Society/ (previously known as Nauka. Kultura. Predprinimatelstvo. /Science. Politics. Entrepreneurship/), methodical materials and manuals on sociology.

The Institute runs postgraduate and doctoral courses.

The International UNESCO Chair of Social and Humanitarian Sciences has been set up at the Institute.

The Institute has such branches as the United South Branch, North Caucasian Center, North Ossetian Center of Social Research, etc.

The ISPR maintains close links and cooperates with scientific institutions of the Russian Academy of Sciences, academic and scientific circles of the former USSR member-states, as well as with Great Britain, Germany, Israel, China, Netherlands, USA, France and other countries.

See also
Vilen Ivanov
Dzhangir Kerimov
Gennady Osipov
Rudolph Yanovskiy
Vladimir Martynenko
Alexandr Kapto

References
Official RAS site

1991 establishments in Russia
Political science organizations
Institutes of the Russian Academy of Sciences
Social science institutes
Organizations established in 1991